Easy is the debut studio album by the Australian rock band the Easybeats, released on 23 September 1965.

Production
Most of the album was recorded at EMI Studios in Sydney in two consecutive all-night sessions.  It was produced by Albert Productions founder, Ted Albert.  It also features their hit single "She's So Fine", which was recorded at Armstrong Studios in Melbourne with further overdubs in Sydney.

Releases
It was released by Albert Productions on the Parlophone label in Australia on 23 September 1965. The front cover's artwork features a photograph by Australian photographer Ian Morgan of the group miming on the Seven Network music television series Sing, Sing, Sing.  It was only released in mono; no stereo mix was made.  It was reissued by Albert Productions (this time on their own label) in the 1980s on LP and compact disc.  Originally released in Australia only, it would not be available internationally until the 1990s when reissue label Repertoire Records released the album in 1992 with eight bonus tracks.  These included B-sides, their debut single "For My Woman"/"Say That You're Mine", outtakes, alternate mixes from the Good Friday album and a live recording of "She's So Fine" from 1966.

Track listing

All songs written by Stevie Wright and George Young except as noted.

Personnel
The Easybeats
Stevie Wright - vocals, percussion
Harry Vanda - vocals, lead guitar
George Young - vocals, rhythm guitar
Dick Diamonde - vocals, bass guitar
Snowy Fleet - vocals, drums
Production Team
Ted Albert - producer
Bill Armstrong - engineer on "She's So Fine".
Ian Morgan - front cover photography
Mike Vaughan - liner notes

Sales charts and certification

Australian Charts

References

The Easybeats albums
1965 debut albums
Albert Productions albums